Wonder Nine refers to any semi-automatic pistol that is chambered in 9×19mm Parabellum and has a staggered column magazine, as well as a double-action trigger for at least the first shot. 

The term was coined by firearms author Robert Shimek, and became popular in American firearm-related magazines during the 1980s and 1990s by those advocating their use by police forces. At the time most American police departments were still using revolvers, with the majority chambered in either .38 Special or .357 Magnum.

The simplicity of being able to fire the first shot just by pulling the trigger (a prominent feature of double-action revolvers), larger ammunition capacity, and faster reloading of ammunition with the use of box magazines are the "wonderful" features of a semi-automatic pistol.

Examples include the Heckler & Koch VP70 (1970), Smith & Wesson Model 59 (1971), CZ-75 (1975), Star Model 28 (1975), Beretta 92 (1976), Steyr GB (1981), Glock 17 (1982), FN HP DA (1982), SIG Sauer P226 (1984), Ruger P85 (1985), Walther P88 (1988), IWI Jericho 941 (1990), Vektor SP1 (1992), Heckler & Koch USP (1993), Bersa Thunder 9 (1994), Walther P99 (1997), and Steyr M (1999).

Notes

References
 The Wonder Nine invasion

Pistols